The Capitol Albums, Volume 1 is a boxed set compilation comprising the Beatles' 1964 American Capitol Records releases. The set, which features the first official stereo versions of a number of tracks on CD, was released in late 2004.  The CDs were mastered from submaster tapes from the Capitol Records vaults which were prepared by Capitol A&R executive Dave Dexter Jr., who added reverb to several tracks and simulated stereo ("fake stereo") on some mono tracks.

The box set debuted on the Billboard 200 album chart on 4 December 2004 at number 35 with sales of 37,303 copies. It spent 6 weeks on the chart.  The box was certified with gold and platinum awards on 17 December 2004 by the RIAA.

Disc listing
Each disc in the collection contains both the stereo and mono versions of each album. See below for links to articles pertaining to each individual album.

Promotional disc
In the weeks prior to the release of the box set, a promotional sampler disc was sent to radio stations and reviewers. It included eight tracks, with a  stereo (tracks 1–8) and mono (tracks 9–16) version of each.

All songs by Lennon–McCartney, except where noted.
"All My Loving"
"I Wanna Be Your Man"
"I Call Your Name"
"Roll Over Beethoven" (Chuck Berry)
"Things We Said Today"
"If I Fell"
"She's a Woman"
"I'm a Loser"

Release details
The CD box set was released in various countries in November 2004.

References

External links
Capitol Records Press Release
Essay by Bruce Spizer

2004 compilation albums
The Beatles compilation albums
Albums produced by George Martin
Capitol Records compilation albums
Apple Records compilation albums
Albums arranged by George Martin